Little Orphant Annie is a 1918 American silent drama film directed by Colin Campbell and stars Colleen Moore, in her first leading role, as the title character. The film is based on James Whitcomb Riley's popular 1885 poem of the same title. Riley also appears in the film.

Excerpt from Little Orphant Annie
Little Orphant Annie’s come to our house to stay,
An’ wash the cups an’ saucers up, an’ brush the crumbs away,
An’ shoo the chickens off the porch, an’ dust the hearth, an’ sweep,
An’ make the fire, an’ bake the bread, an’ earn her board-an’-keep;
An’ all us other children, when the supper things is done,
We set around the kitchen fire an’ has the mostest fun
A-list’nin to the witch-tales ‘at Annie tells about,
An the Gobble-uns ‘at gits you
Ef you
Don’t
Watch
Out!

Plot
Annie, left orphaned after the death of her mother, goes to live in an orphanage where she tells her fellow orphans stories of ghosts and goblins. The matron of the orphanage finds Annie's closest relative, the abusive Uncle Thomp. Her uncle who puts her to hard work doing hard labor on his farm, belittling her all the while. Big Dave, a neighbor and tough cow-poke sees this and comes to her aid. Dave becomes her protector. Eventually Annie goes to live with Squire Goode and his large family. There, she entertains the children of the household with her stories, but sees her abusive aunt and uncle as her chief tormentors. She tells stories of how the goblins will take away the children if they are not good. Each story she tells is illustrated. War breaks out and Dave, who Annie adores, enlists. Uncle Thomp, hearing that Dave has been killed in action, takes pleasure in telling Annie the news. Broken-hearted, Annie falls ill and dies in bed, surrounded by family.

Cast
Colleen Moore - Annie
Tom Santschi - Dave Johnson
Harry Lonsdale - Annie's Uncle
Eugenie Besserer - Mrs. Goode
Doris Baker - Orphan
Baby Lillian Wade - Orphan (as Lillian Wade)
Ben Alexander - Orphan
Billy Jacobs - Orphan
George Hupp - Orphan
James Whitcomb Riley - Himself (archive footage)
Mae Gaston - Annie's Mother
Lillian Hayward - Aunt Elizabeth
Lafe McKee - The Good Squire
Jean Stone - Little Annie as a Child

Production notes

The first draft of Little Orphant Annie was written by Gilson Willets and was a more straight forward adaptation of James Whitcomb Riley poem and contained elements of another Riley poem "Where Is Mary Alice Smith". The script was apparently extensively re-written several times and became more of a loose adaptation of Riley's poem. Some outlines have Annie dying in the end and being reunited in heaven ("The Good World") with her mother, where she is wedded to Dave. The surviving version of the film (available on DVD) has Annie fall ill, only to recover and learn Thomp's news was only a bad dream. Only two of the stories Annie tells (from the original poem) are illustrated.

The story is framed with footage of James Whitcomb Riley acting as a narrator of sorts who tells a story. That footage had been filmed by Selig Polyscope Company for an earlier commissioned work by Inter-state Historical Pictures Corporation for a film about Indiana. The footage of Riley was most likely in early 1916 before Riley's death in July 1916. Principal photography began in early December 1917 in the San Francisco Bay Area and lasted through mid-1918.

Little Orphant Annie was one of the last films produced by Selig Polyscope Company. By the end of 1918, shortly before the film's December 1918 release, the company became insolvent and was absorbed by Fox Film Corporation. The film was initially distributed by Pioneer Film Corporation on a state's right basis. In March 1919, distribution rights were sold to World Film Company.

Availability
A 16mm print of Little Orphant Annie survives and was released to home media; it was initially released on VHS by Facets, and on DVD by Grapevine Video. An extensive restoration took place in 2016, restoring several minutes to the film, sourced from several surviving prints. The film remains one of the few early performances of Colleen Moore that survives and is available to the public.

References

External links

1918 films
1918 drama films
Silent American drama films
American silent feature films
American black-and-white films
Films about orphans
Films based on poems
Selig Polyscope Company films
Surviving American silent films
World Film Company films
Films based on works by James Whitcomb Riley
Films directed by Colin Campbell
1910s American films